Jack Petruccelle (born 12 April 1999) is a professional Australian rules footballer playing for the West Coast Eagles in the Australian Football League (AFL).

Petruccelle attended Marymede Catholic College. He was recruited by West Coast with their fifth selection and thirty-eighth overall in the 2017 national draft, after recording the fastest 20-metre sprint at the AFL Draft Combine with a time of 2.87 seconds. He has been described as a 'line-breaking, high-leaping runner'. He made his AFL debut in the eight point win against  at Optus Stadium in round six of the 2018 AFL season. In May 2018, Petruccelle signed a two-year contract extension with West Coast, tying him to the club until 2020.

References

External links 

Australian rules footballers from Victoria (Australia)
West Coast Eagles players
Northern Knights players
Living people
1999 births
West Coast Eagles (WAFL) players
East Perth Football Club players